John Joseph "Jack" Cust III (born January 7, 1979) is an American former professional baseball designated hitter and outfielder. He played in Major League Baseball (MLB) for the Arizona Diamondbacks, Colorado Rockies, Baltimore Orioles, San Diego Padres, Oakland Athletics, and Seattle Mariners.

Early life
Cust was born to Jack Sr. and Faith Cust. His father had played for the Seton Hall Pirates baseball team which went to the 1974 College World Series and his brothers, Kevin and Mike, both played minor league baseball. Cust attended Immaculata High School in Somerville, New Jersey. In 1997, he was first-team High School All-American at first base. Cust initially committed to play college baseball for the Alabama Crimson Tide.

Minor league career
In , Cust, out of high school, was the first round draft pick (30th overall) of the Arizona Diamondbacks, and had a .447 on-base percentage in 35 games in the Rookie League. In , he led the California League in homers (32), on-base percentage (.450), and slugging percentage (.651), and was Baseball America's 1st team Minor League All-Star DH, California League All-Star, and the Arizona Diamondbacks Minor League Player of the Year. 
In , he had a .440 on-base percentage at El Paso in the Texas League while leading the league in walks (117) and strikeouts (150).

In , he was a Pacific Coast League All-Star while leading the league with 102 walks, and in  he was the Triple-A All-Star Game MVP. In , he led the PCL with 143 walks (also leading the minor leagues), walking 24.5% of the time, while sporting a .467 on-base percentage with 30 home runs. In 11 minor league seasons with five different organizations, he hit exactly 200 home runs, had a .286 batting average, and a .429 on-base percentage. Statistically, he hit a home run once every 19 at-bats, struck out once every 3 at-bats, and earned 1 walk per game.

Major league career

Early career
Cust made his Major League debut with the Diamondbacks on September 26, . On January 7, his 23rd birthday, he was traded by the Diamondbacks with catcher JD Closser to the Colorado Rockies for pitcher Mike Myers. Cust spent the majority of the 2002 season with the Rockies' Triple-A affiliate, the Colorado Springs Sky Sox. He played in 35 games with the big league club, going 11–65 (.169 batting average) with 1 home run.

Baltimore Orioles
The Rockies sent him to the Baltimore Orioles for Chris Richard and cash on March 11, . Cust appeared in 28 games (27 in 2003, 1 in 2004) during his two seasons with the ballclub, spending most of the time with the Ottawa Lynx. He was most noted as an Oriole for an infamous baserunning gaffe that resulted in his making the final out in a 12-inning 5–4 loss to the New York Yankees at Camden Yards on August 16, 2003. Representing the potential tying run at first base after a two-out pinch-hit walk, he attempted to score on a double to right field by Larry Bigbie, but was caught in a rundown after tumbling to the grass a few steps beyond third base. Even though he outmaneuvered catcher Jorge Posada and third baseman Aaron Boone and was headed towards an undefended home plate, Cust fell to the grass again and was tagged out from behind by Boone.

Cust was granted free agency following the 2004 season.

Oakland Athletics

On November 15, 2004, he was signed by the Oakland Athletics. He spent the whole season in Triple-A Sacramento, and was granted free agency after the season. On December 6, 2005, he signed a minor league contract with the San Diego Padres. He just had 3 at-bats in the  season. On May 3, 2007, the Padres traded him to the Oakland Athletics, although he was rumored to be joining Japan's Chiba Lotte Marines. The Athletics needed another designated hitter due to an injury to veteran Mike Piazza. Cust quickly endeared himself to A's fans by hitting 6 home runs in his first 7 games. Cust would hit .346 with 14 RBI during that seven-game stretch. On May 13, 2007, with two outs and an 0–2 count in the bottom of the ninth, the A's rallied to score 5 runs to beat Joe Borowski and the Cleveland Indians 10–7, ending with Cust hitting a walk-off 3-run home run.

After hitting .348 with 1 double and 5 home runs along with 13 RBI, Cust shared Co-American League Player of the Week honors along with teammate Dan Johnson for the week ending May 13, 2007. On August 10, Cust hit his first major league grand slam off relief pitcher Macay McBride of the Detroit Tigers after hitting a 3-run double earlier in the game to give him a career-high 7 RBI. He finished the 2007 season leading the Athletics in home runs with 26, walking 21.0% of the time (tops in the major leagues) but striking out 41.5% of the time (also tops in the majors).

On September 19, he broke the AL record for most strikeouts in one season with 187. For the season he struck out 41.0% of the time, the highest percentage in major league baseball, once every 2.4 at-bats.  He also walked 18.8% of the time, the second highest rate in the majors, and led the American League with 111 walks.

On December 12, 2009, Cust was non-tendered by the Athletics making him a free agent. On January 7, 2010, Cust re-signed with the Oakland Athletics on a 1-year $2.5 million contract. However, he was designated for assignment on April 3, at the end of Spring training. On April 7, Cust cleared waivers and was outrighted to Triple-A. During his 33 minor league game tenure, he hit .273 with 4 home runs and 19 RBIs, and matched his 33 Ks w/ 33 walks. On May 15, he was added to the 40-man roster and recalled. In the first game he appeared in, he made a comedic error in left field. He appeared mostly in the outfield until Eric Chavez ended up on the DL, then assumed the primary DH spot. On September 13, Cust hit his 100th career home run in a 3–1 Athletics victory over the Kansas City Royals at Kauffman Stadium.

Seattle Mariners & Philadelphia Phillies
Following the 2010 season, Cust was non-tendered for the second year in a row, and became a free agent. On December 8, 2010, Cust signed a one-year deal with the Seattle Mariners. On July 29, 2011, the Mariners released Cust after he hit just .213 with 3 home runs. 

Cust signed a minor league contract with the Philadelphia Phillies on August 12, 2011. He was released a week later on August 20.

Houston Astros
In January 2012 Cust signed a one-year deal minor league contract worth $600,000 with an option for a second year with the Houston Astros, but was released on March 27 before the end of spring training.

New York Yankees
On March 28, 2012 he signed a minor league contract with the Yankees and was assigned to its Triple-A affiliate Scranton/Wilkes-Barre Yankees, but was released by the Yankees on August 1.

Toronto Blue Jays
On August 4, 2012, Cust was signed to a minor league contract by the Toronto Blue Jays and assigned to their Triple-A affiliate Las Vegas 51s. On November 3, he was declared a minor league free agent by Major League Baseball.

Tampa Bay Rays
On February 17, 2013, the Rays announced that Cust would be attending major league spring training on a minor league contract. On March 23, 2013 the Rays announced that they had released Cust.

Baltimore Orioles
After spending all of 2013 out of professional baseball, Cust resurfaced with the Orioles after signing a minor league deal on February 5, 2014. His comeback attempt lasted 44 days; he was released on March 21.

Mitchell Report
On December 13, 2007, Cust was named in the Mitchell Report as a user of performance-enhancing drugs, although there was never any evidence outside of a conversation he once supposedly had with former teammate Larry Bigbie. Cust denied any wrongdoing or use of performance-enhancing drugs and said there were inaccuracies in his citation in the report.

See also
List of Major League Baseball players named in the Mitchell Report

References

External links

1979 births
Living people
American expatriate baseball players in Canada
Arizona Diamondbacks players
Arizona League Diamondbacks players
Baltimore Orioles players
Baseball players from New Jersey
Colorado Rockies players
Colorado Springs Sky Sox players
El Paso Diablos players
High Desert Mavericks players
Immaculata High School (New Jersey) alumni
Las Vegas 51s players
Lehigh Valley IronPigs players
Lethbridge Black Diamonds players
Major League Baseball designated hitters
Major League Baseball outfielders
Oakland Athletics players
Ottawa Lynx players
People from Flemington, New Jersey
Portland Beavers players
Sacramento River Cats players
San Diego Padres players
Scranton/Wilkes-Barre Yankees players
Seattle Mariners players
South Bend Silver Hawks players
Sportspeople from Hunterdon County, New Jersey
Tucson Sidewinders players